"After Hours" is a song by Canadian singer the Weeknd. It was released by XO and Republic Records as the promotional single from his fourth studio album of the same name on February 19, 2020. The Weeknd wrote and produced the song with its producers Illangelo, DaHeala and Mario Winans, with Belly receiving additional writing credits. Snippets of the song were included on the parent album's self titled short film. A remix of the song by the Blaze was released alongside the deluxe edition of its parent album on March 23, 2020.

Background and release 
On February 13, 2020, the Weeknd announced the title of the parent album of the same name as After Hours, following the release of the commercially successful singles "Heartless" and "Blinding Lights". Five days later on February 18, he announced the release date of the promotional single "After Hours" and then revealed the cover art of its parent album. Upon the release of "After Hours" on February 19, 2020, the release date of its parent album was also revealed.

Composition and lyrics
"After Hours" is a "dark, swirling" and "ominous" electro and house composition. According to Sheldon Pearce of Pitchfork, the track "opens with his old signature style - falsetto, echoes, and recurrent tones - until suddenly it erupts into dance production". 

The lyrics of the song discuss the Weeknd's regret of ending a relationship with a former lover, and his desire for them to reconcile and to have children. The song proceeds to hear Weeknd taking responsibility for the relationship's demise, promising that if his former lover were to return to him, he would not disappoint them again.

Critical reception 
Critics compared its sound to the Weeknd's early Trilogy material. Fan reaction was also favorable. In a weekly round up review, the staff from the music news website BrooklynVegan, described the song as being a "four-on-the-floor banger." Shaad D'Souza of The FADER placed the song on his list of "The 20 best pop songs right now", stating "Abel Tesfaye takes a dip into Trilogy territory with this dank and depressive sex fantasy. I love it!"

Commercial performance 
"After Hours" entered the Billboard Hot 100 at number 77 on the issue dated February 29, 2020, after two days of tracking. The following week it climbed 57 spots up to number 20 on the chart.

On the Rolling Stone Top 100 Songs chart, the song debuted at number 43 on the week ending on February 20, 2020. It later rose to number five on the chart, the following week, on the tracking period ending on February 27, 2020.

In the singer's native country of Canada, "After Hours" reached number 14 on the Canadian Hot 100. In the United Kingdom, the song reached number 20, becoming the Weeknd's 19th top 40 hit in the nation.

Personnel 
Credits adapted from Tidal.

 The Weeknd – vocals, songwriting, production, keyboards, programming
 Belly – songwriting
 DaHeala – songwriting, production, keyboards, programming
 Illangelo – songwriting, production, keyboards, programming, engineering, mixing
 Mario Winans – songwriting, production  
 Shin Kamiyama – engineering
 Dave Kutch – mastering
 Kevin Peterson – mastering

Charts

Certifications

Release history

References

External links 
 
 

2020 songs
2020 singles
Republic Records singles
XO (record label) singles
Songs written by the Weeknd
The Weeknd songs
Song recordings produced by Illangelo
Songs written by Illangelo
Song recordings produced by the Weeknd
Songs written by Belly (rapper)
Songs written by DaHeala
Songs written by Mario Winans
Alternative R&B songs
Electro house songs